Leo Garel (1917 – July 4, 1999) was an American artist. He illustrated cartoons for such notable magazines as The New Yorker, The Saturday Evening Post and Playboy.

Early life
Garel was born in Brooklyn, New York, to Max and Sarah Garil (née Kramer); his surname was changed from 'Garil' to 'Garel' to sound more American. Both of Garel's parents were Ashkenazi Jewish immigrants from an area of the Russian Empire near Kiev.

Career
Garel was a mentor, instructor and friend to many who exhibited at and made art upstairs at the Lavender Door, a Stockbridge tradition that was attached to the Austen Riggs Center.  Thus, Garel, in a natural way, helped hundreds of emotionally charged psychiatric patients paint their way out of difficulties that were often too complex for mere therapy to cure. So many of the lives he touched were literally turned around by the knowledge that if they applied themselves their art could gain an audience.  An audience not judgmental, in a field where most work is done alone:  a perfect combination for those trying to overcome the scars left by myriad unusual circumstances too awful to describe here. His art was superb, but his capacity as a lifesaver was unmatched.

Later years
He lived the later part of his life in Stockbridge, Massachusetts until his death from cancer. He was survived by a brother, two children and two grandchildren.

References
AskArt: Leo Garel

1917 births
1999 deaths
American cartoonists
Jewish American artists
20th-century American Jews